José Ariel Núñez Portelli (born 12 September 1988) is a Paraguayan international footballer who plays as a forward for Club Guaraní.

Club career
Born in Asunción, Núñez spent his early career in his native Paraguay, playing for Libertad, Presidente Hayes and Tacuary.

In July 2013 he went on loan to Spanish club Osasuna.

On 31 January 2014 he signed a four-year contract with Danish side Brøndby. He made his debut for the club on 24 February 2014, appearing as a substitute for the final seven minutes of the game. He scored his first goal for the club on 30 March 2014, in the 1–0 away victory against Viborg. The goal was also the first goal by a Paraguayan player in the league.

Núñez ranked number 6 in a list of the most expensive players in Paraguayan football for 2015 published by Diario Extra.

After leaving Brøndby, he returned to Paraguay to play with Club Olimpia and Club Nacional, and in Argentina with Unión de Santa Fe. He signed for Wilstermann for the 2019 season.

International career
He made his international debut for Paraguay in 2011.

References

1988 births
Living people
Paraguayan footballers
Paraguay international footballers
Club Libertad footballers
Club Presidente Hayes footballers
Club Tacuary footballers
CA Osasuna players
Brøndby IF players
Club Olimpia footballers
Club Nacional footballers
Unión de Santa Fe footballers
C.D. Jorge Wilstermann players
12 de Octubre Football Club players
Club Guaraní players
Paraguayan Primera División players
La Liga players
Danish Superliga players
Argentine Primera División players
Bolivian Primera División players
Association football forwards
Paraguayan expatriate footballers
Paraguayan expatriate sportspeople in Spain
Expatriate footballers in Spain
Paraguayan expatriate sportspeople in Denmark
Expatriate men's footballers in Denmark
Paraguayan expatriate sportspeople in Argentina
Expatriate footballers in Argentina
Paraguayan expatriate sportspeople in Bolivia
Expatriate footballers in Bolivia